Carnie Wilson (born April 29, 1968) is an American singer and television personality. She is the daughter of Brian Wilson and in 1989 co-founded the pop music trio Wilson Phillips with her younger sister Wendy. From 1995 onwards, she has also been a host or guest star on a variety of television shows.

Early life and musical career
Carnie Wilson was born in Los Angeles on April 29, 1968, the daughter of Brian Wilson of The Beach Boys and of his first wife, former singer Marilyn Rovell of The Honeys. Her mother is of Jewish heritage, while her father is of Dutch, Scottish, English, German, Irish, and Swedish ancestry.

She co-founded Wilson Phillips with her younger sister Wendy and childhood friend Chynna Phillips when they were in their teens. They released two albums, Wilson Phillips and Shadows and Light, which between them sold twelve million copies. The group also charted three No. 1 singles and six top 20 hits in the United States before disbanding in 1993.

Carnie & Wendy Wilson continued to record together, releasing the Christmas album Hey Santa! in 1993. They joined with their father for the 1997 album The Wilsons. Carnie also sang "Our Time Has Come" with James Ingram for the 1997 animated film Cats Don't Dance.

In 2003, Carnie attempted to launch a solo music career with the album For the First Time. The record featured a remake of the Olivia DiNucci-penned Samantha Mumba ballad "Don't Need You To (Tell Me I'm Pretty)", retitled "I Don't Need You To", as its first single. However, the single failed to gain interest and the album was ultimately shelved when Carnie regrouped with Wendy and Chynna as Wilson Phillips in 2004.

Reunited, the band released a third album, named California, which appeared on Sony Music's record label. The album featured cover songs, primarily from the 1960s and 1970s, and specifically highlighted the glory days of their parents' California-based musical groups: The Mamas & the Papas and the Beach Boys.

In 2006, Carnie released an album of lullabies, A Mother's Gift: Lullabies from the Heart, created shortly after the birth of her daughter, Lola. She released her second solo effort in October 2007, a Christmas album entitled Christmas with Carnie, featuring a song written by her husband, "Warm Lovin' Christmastime".

Television career

From 1995 to 1996, Carnie hosted her own short-lived syndicated television talk show, Carnie! The series was launched during the mid-1990s wave of popularity in "tabloid" talk shows, which followed the sudden successes of Ricki Lake and Jerry Springer. Former  Cosmopolitan magazine's Bachelor-of-the-Month Chris Greeley was a guest on the television pilot. Wilson found the experience a disappointment and a source of professional and personal frustration.

She later guest-starred on episodes of That 70s Show in 2001 and Sabrina the Teenage Witch, before joining the fourth season of VH1's Celebrity Fit Club in 2006.

Wilson has also been a correspondent on Entertainment Tonight and in 2006 hosted a special on E! titled 101 Celebrity Slimdowns. She became a cast member of the CMT series Gone Country in January 2008. In April 2008, she was a cast member of the VH1 series Celebracadabra. In July 2008, she starred in a show called Outsider's Inn.

She hosted GSN's new edition of The Newlywed Game, which premiered April 6, 2009, until late 2010, when she was replaced by Sherri Shepherd.

In addition, a reality show starring Wilson, Carnie Wilson: Unstapled, began airing on the Game Show Network on January 14, 2010. In August 2011, Wilson became a judge on the ABC show Karaoke Battle USA.

On January 2, 2012, she appeared on ABC's Celebrity Wife Swap, trading places with actress Tracey Gold for a week.

In the spring of 2012, Carnie along with her sister Wendy and childhood friend Chynna Phillips starred in their own reality show on the TV Guide Network about the rebirth of their band, Wilson Phillips. The show, called Wilson Phillips: Still Holding On, logged the journey of the trio getting back together to reform Wilson Phillips on the road, in the studio, and at home as working mothers. A pilot episode aired in November 2011. Seven additional episodes aired in April and May 2012.

Wilson starred in the Chopped "All Stars: Celebrities" episode and got to second place.

In 2013, Carnie became a member of "Team Rachael" on the second season of the Food Network's Rachael vs. Guy: Celebrity Cook-Off. She came in second to Dean McDermott and won $10,000 for her charity, an autism research foundation.

She also frequently fills in as a guest host on CBS's The Talk.

In 2015, she played herself as an auto insurance claimant on a Progressive Insurance TV commercial. On January 28, 2016, it was announced that she is going to be a contestant on The New Celebrity Apprentice (also known as The Apprentice 15 and Celebrity Apprentice 8). On January 2, 2017, Wilson was the second contestant fired, finishing in fifteenth place, earning no money for her charity, The Weight Loss Surgery Foundation of America.

In July 2016, Wilson Phillips reunited and performed on ABC's Greatest Hits.

In February 2017, Wilson made a guest appearance on the reality show The Real Housewives of Beverly Hills.

Personal life

Marriage & family
Wilson married musician and producer Robert Bonfiglio in 2000. They have daughters Lola, born in April 2005, and Luciana, born in June 2009.

Her uncles were Dennis Wilson and Carl Wilson. She is a cousin to Beach Boys co-founder Mike Love and his brother, former NBA player Stan Love, as well as Stan's son, Cleveland Cavaliers player Kevin Love.

Bell's palsy diagnosis
On March 18, 2013, Wilson disclosed, through Twitter, that she had been diagnosed with Bell's palsy.

Love Bites by Carnie
On August 26, 2017, Carnie and her business partner, childhood friend Tiffany Miller, opened Love Bites by Carnie, a commercial production bakery in Sherwood, Oregon, a suburb of Portland. Love Bites by Carnie makes gourmet, bite-sized cookies.

References

External links
 

1968 births
American women pop singers
American game show hosts
American people of Dutch descent
American people of German descent
American people of Irish descent
American people of Jewish descent
American people of Scottish descent
American people of Swedish descent
Brian Wilson
Living people
Participants in American reality television series
Singers from Los Angeles
Carnie
Wilson Phillips members
The Apprentice (franchise) contestants